Mart Opmann (born 27 March 1956 in Surju) is an Estonian politician. He has been a member of X Riigikogu.

1995–1999 he was Minister of Finance.

He was a member of the People's Union of Estonia party.

References

Living people
1956 births
People's Union of Estonia politicians
Members of the Riigikogu, 2003–2007
Finance ministers of Estonia
University of Tartu alumni
People from Saarde Parish